Robby Roarsen Haugli (born 1974) is a Norwegian sprint canoer who competed in the late 1990s. He won a bronze medal in the K-4 200 m event at the 1998 ICF Canoe Sprint World Championships in Szeged.

He represented the club Strand KK.

References

1974 births
Living people
Norwegian male canoeists
ICF Canoe Sprint World Championships medalists in kayak